The Eufaula people were a tribe of Native Americans in the United States, located in the Southeast. A Muskogean-speaking people, they possibly broke off from the Kealedji or Hilibi tribe. They were part of the Muscogee Creek Confederacy.

Some Eufaula lived along the Chattahoochee River in what became the state of Georgia. The Lower Creek Eufaula settled there by 1733, and quite possibly earlier than that. With more frequent contact with Europeans and later Americans, they had trade and adopted some European-style customs. 

In 1832, theirs was the only Upper Creek town listed on the census. In 1825 their chief Yoholo Micco traveled to Washington, D.C. in an attempt to renegotiate the Treaty of Indian Springs (1821). They were unsuccessful, and the very disadvantageous Treaty of Indian Springs (1825) was enacted which forced them to move across the river in Eufaula, Alabama, where a bike trail commemorates their story.

In 1836 they were forced further west again, during the Trail of Tears. Their people were the only Upper Creek town that moved to Indian Territory; they settled near what developed as Eufaula, Oklahoma, named for them and their towns.

Namesakes
Their name is preserved in the modern cities of Eufaula, Alabama and Eufaula, Oklahoma; and also with lakes, specifically Lake Eufaula in Oklahoma and Lake Eufaula in Alabama.

Notes

 Biography of Yoholo-Micco and his son in Indians of North America, c. 1844

Muscogee
Native American tribes in Georgia (U.S. state)
Native American tribes in Alabama